Two Conversations is the fifth studio album by Indie Rock band The Appleseed Cast, released in the U.S. on July 22, 2003 on Tiger Style Records.

Track listing

The Appleseed Cast
Christopher Crisci	Lead vocals, rhythm guitar
Jordan Geiger – Keyboards
Aaron Pillar – Lead guitar
Marc Young – Bass guitar
Josh Baruth – Drums

Artwork
Travis Pesnell – Album Artwork
Nick Pimentel – Design, Layout Design

Production
Ed Rose – Producer, engineer

References

2003 albums
The Appleseed Cast albums
Albums produced by Ed Rose